is a former Japanese football player.

Playing career
Ai was born in Saitama Prefecture on April 17, 1968. After graduating from Rissho University, he joined Nissan Motors (later Yokohama Marinos) in 1991. However he could hardly play in the match and he moved to Japan Football League (JFL) club Otsuka Pharmaceutical in 1994. Although he became a regular player as midfielder in 1994, he lost his opportunity to play in 1995. He moved to JFL club Denso in 1996 and Ventforet Kofu in 1997 and he played as regular player at both clubs. At Ventforet in 1999, the club was promoted to new league J2 League. He retired end of 2000 season.

Club statistics

References

External links

1968 births
Living people
Rissho University alumni
Association football people from Saitama Prefecture
Japanese footballers
Japan Soccer League players
J1 League players
J2 League players
Japan Football League (1992–1998) players
Yokohama F. Marinos players
Tokushima Vortis players
FC Kariya players
Ventforet Kofu players
Association football midfielders